Communauté d'agglomération Cœur d'Essonne (also: Cœur d'Essonne Agglomération) is an agglomeration community, an intercommunal structure, centred on the city of Sainte-Geneviève-des-Bois, a southern suburb of Paris. It is located in the Essonne department, in the Île-de-France region, northern France. It was created in January 2016. Its area is 132.7 km2. Its population was 201,873 in 2018.

Composition
The communauté d'agglomération consists of the following 21 communes:

Arpajon
Avrainville
Brétigny-sur-Orge
Breuillet
Bruyères-le-Châtel
Cheptainville
Égly
Fleury-Mérogis
Guibeville
Leuville-sur-Orge
Longpont-sur-Orge
Marolles-en-Hurepoix
Morsang-sur-Orge
La Norville
Ollainville
Le Plessis-Pâté
Sainte-Geneviève-des-Bois
Saint-Germain-lès-Arpajon
Saint-Michel-sur-Orge
Villemoisson-sur-Orge
Villiers-sur-Orge

References

Coeur d'Essonne
Intercommunalities of Essonne